Coendou speratus, known locally as coandumirim and commonly as the dwarf porcupine, is small porcupine of the Coendou genus found in northeastern Brazil. This small porcupine has a long tail and a spiny appearance as its dorsal fur is not long. It's dorsal colouring is blackish which contrasts with the brownish tips of its quills. It is distinguished from Coendou nycthemera by its tricolored quills whereas nycthemera is bicoloured.

Originally found in the Pernambuco Centre of Endemism in 2013, it was later discovered also at Murici Ecological Station and later at Garanhuns as well.

References

Porcupines
Coendou
Taxa described in 2013